Sharfuddoula Ibne Shahid (born 16 October 1976), also known as Sharfuddoula Saikat, is an international cricket umpire and a former first-class player from Bangladesh.

Playing career
In 1994 Sharfuddoula played three matches for Bangladesh at the 1994 ICC Trophy in Kenya.
Sharfuddoula played 10 first-class cricket matches for Dhaka Metropolis in 2000 and 2001.

Umpiring career
He made his first-class debut as an umpire in February 2007 in a match between Barisal Division and Sylhet Division.

In January 2010 he umpired his first One Day International match between Bangladesh and Sri Lanka becoming the tenth Bangladeshi to umpire at this level.

On 17 March 2018 at the 2018 Cricket World Cup Qualifier, along with Langton Rusere, he was one of the on-field umpires during the ninth place playoff match between Papua New Guinea and Hong Kong. The fixture at Old Hararians in Harare became the 4,000th ODI match to be played.

In October 2018, he was named as one of the twelve on-field umpires for the 2018 ICC Women's World Twenty20. In October 2019, he was appointed as one of the twelve umpires to officiate matches in the 2019 ICC T20 World Cup Qualifier tournament in the United Arab Emirates. In January 2020, he was named as one of the sixteen umpires for the 2020 Under-19 Cricket World Cup tournament in South Africa.

Due to the global COVID-19 pandemic, ICC rescinded its decision of using neutral umpires for test matches, instead allowing local umpires to officiate in test matches. As a result, he was named as an on-field umpires for both test matches played between Bangladesh and West Indies, becoming fifth Bangladeshi umpires to officiate in test matches.

In February 2022, he was named as one of the on-field umpires for the 2022 Women's Cricket World Cup in New Zealand.
In January 2023, he was named as one of the on-field umpires for the 2023 ICC Under-19 Women's T20 World Cup.

See also
 List of Test cricket umpires
 List of One Day International cricket umpires
 List of Twenty20 International cricket umpires

References

External links
 

1976 births
Living people
Bangladeshi Test cricket umpires
Bangladeshi One Day International cricket umpires
Bangladeshi Twenty20 International cricket umpires
Bangladeshi cricketers
Dhaka Metropolis cricketers
Cricketers from Dhaka